Hugo Osterhaus (15 June 1851 in Belleville, Illinois – 11 June 1927 in Castle Point, New York) was a Rear Admiral in the United States Navy. He was the son of Civil War Major General Peter J. Osterhaus (1823–1917) and father of Navy Admiral Hugo Wilson Osterhaus (1878–1972).

U.S. Navy career
Osterhaus was appointed Midshipman on 22 September 1865 and received his commission as an Ensign on 13 July 1871. He was commissioned Master, 12 February 1874;  Lieutenant 13 March 1880; Lieutenant Commander 3 March 1899;  Commander 2 July 1901;  Captain 19 February 1906;  Rear Admiral 4 December 1909 and was placed on the retired list 15 June 1913.

He was captain of the battleship  as part of the Great White Fleet which was a United States Navy force that completed a circumnavigation of the world from December 16, 1907, to February 22, 1909 by order of U.S. President Theodore Roosevelt. Roosevelt sought to demonstrate growing American military power and blue-water navy capability.

Osterhaus was recalled to active duty during World War I serving from 11 April 1917 until 1 November 1920 when he was relieved of active duty and returned home.

His flag commands included the Second Division, Atlantic Fleet; the Mare Island Navy Yard; the 12th Naval District; and the Atlantic Fleet.

Awarded the Navy Cross
During World War I he received the Navy Cross for services in the Office of Naval Districts.

Death
RADM Hugo Osterhaus died 11 June 1927. He is buried at Arlington National Cemetery with his wife Mary W. (1855–1942).

Namesake
The destroyer , launched 18 April 1943 and sponsored by Miss Helen Osterhaus, was so named in his honor.

References

 

1851 births
1927 deaths
People from Belleville, Illinois
Recipients of the Navy Cross (United States)
United States Navy personnel of World War I
United States Navy admirals
Burials at Arlington National Cemetery
Military personnel from Illinois